Jessica Moore and Galina Voskoboeva were the defending champions, but both players chose not to participate.

Anna Blinkova and Xenia Knoll won the title, defeating Cornelia Lister and Renata Voráčová in the final, 7–5, 7–5.

Seeds

Draw

Draw

References
Main Draw

Empire Slovak Open - Doubles